The 1980–81 Louisville Cardinals men's basketball team represented the University of Louisville during the 1980-81 NCAA Division I men's basketball season, Louisville's 67th season of intercollegiate competition. The Cardinals competed in the Metro Conference and were coached by Denny Crum, who was in his tenth season.  The team played its home games at Freedom Hall.

The Cardinals won the Metro Conference tournament championship (their 3rd), defeating Cincinnati 42–31. As defending Champion Louisville was upset by a half-court shot by U.S. Reed and lost to Arkansas 74–73 in the NCAA tournament second round. The Cardinals finished with a 21–9 (11–1) record.

Roster

Schedule

References

Louisville Cardinals men's basketball seasons
Louisville
Louisville
Louisville Cardinals men's basketball, 1980-81
Louisville Cardinals men's basketball, 1980-81